The 1964 United States Senate election in Minnesota took place on November 3, 1964. Incumbent Democratic U.S. Senator Eugene McCarthy defeated Republican challenger Wheelock Whitney Jr., to win a second term.

Democratic–Farmer–Labor primary

Candidates

Declared
 Eugene J. McCarthy, Incumbent U.S. Senator since 1959
 Joseph Nowak
 R. H. Underdahl

Results

Republican primary

Candidates

Declared
 Wheelock Whitney, Jr., Investment banker and member of the board of directors of the Minnesota Twins

Results

General election

Results

See also 
 United States Senate elections, 1964

References

Minnesota
1964
1964 Minnesota elections